Zephyrarchaea is a genus of Australian assassin spiders first described by Michael Gordon Rix & Mark Harvey in 2012 for nine new species and two that were formerly placed in the genus Austrarchaea. The name is based on the Latin , meaning "west wind", referring to the western distribution in Australia and a preference for windy, coastal habitats by some species. It has been encountered in Western Australia, Victoria and South Australia.

Differentiation from Austrarchaea
They are distinguished from Austrarchaea by a notably shorter carapace, the distribution of long hairs (setae) on the male chelicerae, and by the shape of the conductor of the male palpal bulb. The Australian Alps may be a barrier dividing the two genera.

Species
 the genus contains eleven species:
 Zephyrarchaea austini Rix & Harvey, 2012 – Kangaroo Island, South Australia
 Zephyrarchaea barrettae Rix & Harvey, 2012 – Western Australia
 Zephyrarchaea grayi Rix & Harvey, 2012 – Victoria
 Zephyrarchaea janineae Rix & Harvey, 2012 – Western Australia
 Zephyrarchaea mainae (Platnick, 1991) – Western Australia; type
 Zephyrarchaea marae Rix & Harvey, 2012 – Victoria
 Zephyrarchaea marki Rix & Harvey, 2012 – Western Australia
 Zephyrarchaea melindae Rix & Harvey, 2012 – Western Australia
 Zephyrarchaea porchi Rix & Harvey, 2012 – Victoria
 Zephyrarchaea robinsi (Harvey, 2002) – Western Australia
 Zephyrarchaea vichickmani Rix & Harvey, 2012 – Victoria

References

Araneomorphae genera
Archaeidae
Endemic fauna of Australia
Spiders of Australia